Samuel Fisher may refer to:

 Samuel Fisher (Quaker) (1605–1665), English Quaker controversialist
 Samuel Fisher (died 1681) (c. 1605–1681), English ejected minister
 Samuel Fisher (clergyman) (1777–1857), American clergyman and educator
 Samuel Rhoads Fisher (1794–1839), secretary of the Navy of the Republic of Texas
 Samuel Rowland Fisher (1745–1834), Philadelphia merchant in Revolutionary times
 Samuel Fisher, Baron Fisher of Camden (1905–1979), British businessman and Jewish leader
 Samuel H. Fisher (1867–1957), American attorney and print historian

See also
 Samuel von Fischer (1859–1934), Hungarian-born German publisher
 Sam Fisher (disambiguation)